Henri Mouillefarine (1 August 1910 – 21 July 1994) was a French cyclist who competed in the 1932 Summer Olympics. He won a silver medal in the team pursuit event.

References

1910 births
1994 deaths
French male cyclists
Olympic cyclists of France
Cyclists at the 1932 Summer Olympics
Olympic silver medalists for France
Olympic medalists in cycling
People from Montrouge
Medalists at the 1932 Summer Olympics
Sportspeople from Hauts-de-Seine
Cyclists from Île-de-France